The 1996 Railway Cup Hurling Championship was the 68th staging of the Railway Cup since its establishment by the Gaelic Athletic Association in 1927. The cup began on 25 February 1996 and ended on 18 March 1996.

Munster were the defending champions.

On 18 March 1996, Munster won the cup after a 2-20 to 0–10 defeat of Leinster in the final at Cusack Park. This was their 40th Railway Cup title overall and their second title in succession.

Results

Semi-finals

Final

Bibliography

 Donegan, Des, The Complete Handbook of Gaelic Games (DBA Publications Limited, 2005).

References

Railway Cup Hurling Championship
Railway Cup Hurling Championship
Hurling